Cuxhaven is a district (Landkreis) in Lower Saxony, Germany. It is bounded by (from the east and clockwise) the districts of Stade, Rotenburg, Osterholz and Wesermarsch, the city of Bremerhaven and the North Sea.

History 
The district was established in 1977 by merging the former districts of Land Hadeln and Wesermünde. The town of Cuxhaven lost its status as a district-free town and became the capital of the new district.

Geography 
The district is often nicknamed Cuxland. It is located on the coast of the North Sea and is enclosed by the river mouths of Elbe and Weser. The coasts are part of the Lower Saxony Wadden Sea National Park.

Coat of arms 
The arms display Saint Nicholas, who is the patron saint of fishermen. The coast of the North Sea is symbolised at the bottom of the arms.

Towns and municipalities

References

External links 

 Official website 
 Cuxland tourist website 

 
Districts of Lower Saxony
1977 establishments in West Germany